Hilaire Couvreur (22 September 1924 – 17 February 1998) was a Belgian cyclist.

Couvreur was winner of the Tour du Maroc in 1953 and the Volta a la Comunitat Valenciana in 1958. He also finished third in the 1958 Vuelta a España.

He was born in Sint-Andries near Brugge in Belgium and died in Kortrijk, Belgium.

References

External links
 

Belgian male cyclists
1924 births
1998 deaths
Sportspeople from Bruges
Cyclists from West Flanders
20th-century Belgian people